Girish Khatiwada (born August 30, 1979) is a Nepalese rapper, radio, television personality, and vlogger. He is consistently cited as the first rapper of Nepal and was labeled the "Godfather of Nephop" by The Diplomat Magazine. Khatiwada started his career at the age of 15 with his first track "Meaningless Rap" in 1994 and became mainstream with his counterpart Pranil Timalsena with other tracks like Timi Jaha Pani Jaanchhau, Malai Bhot Deu, Hami Dherai Sana Chhu. Today, besides his career in the Nepalese rap music scene, Khatiwada is also one of the most influential vloggers from Nepal.

Life and career 
Girish Khatiwada was born on August 30, 1979, in Biratnagar, Nepal. In an interview with The Kathmandu Post, Girish said that he was introduced to hip hop music of the west in early 1990s when he was involved in break dancing in Dharan. His first introduction of hip-hop came from a cousin whose parents worked in the Nepali embassy in Washington.

In 1994, at the age of 15, Girish wrote and recorded the first hip-hop song, Meaningless Rap. According to Girish, the song was named so because he initially struggled to understand the obscure slang in English hip hop which he presumed were written and sang only to rhyme and didn't have any meaning. After a moderate success, he was approached by a local record label to produce a full album. This resulted in a team of Girish and Pranil, who were later known by their moniker GP.

During the late 90s, GP took inspiration for their music from the instrumental parts of American hip-hop who would then incorporate traditional Nepali folk song with the help of Nepali audio engineers. This led to the formation of a new Nepali music genre "Nep hop" in the late 90s, which he later named "Lok Hop."

Khatiwada took a break from Nepali hip hop to continue his higher studies in United States in 2008. He came back to Nepal in 2013 to continue his career in music, radio, television and YouTube.

Personal life 
Khatiwada is currently married to his longtime girlfriend Jyoti Ranabhat.

Songs 

 Meaningless Rap
Ma Yesto Chu Ma Testo Chu feat. DA69
 Gharo Bho (Feat. Nabin K Bhattarai)
 Timi Jaha Pani Janchau
 Malai Vote Deu
 Seto Ghoda
 Come Back into My Life
 Back Again
Paisa Ko Saukheen
Miss Kollywood
Be What You Wanna Be
Oi Hoi
Prithivi Narayan Shah
Best in Me
Timilai Napai Chaddina
Number 1 Girl
Imma Live My Life
Sadak Ko Army
Sakina Maile
Jitney Ko Itihaas
Kehi Lagdaina
Kathmandu Ma Trapped
Ganja Man
Baluwatar Singhadurwar
Euta Banda Kotha
Haami Dherai Saana Chhau
Jati Maya
Lok Hop
Prithvi Narayan Shah
Aag Laagi

References 

Nepalese hip hop singers
20th-century Nepalese male singers
1979 births
Living people
21st-century Nepalese male singers
People from Biratnagar